Al Sadd Volleyball ( طائرة السد) is a professional volleyball team based in Doha, Qatar. It competes in the Qatari Volleyball League.

Honors
1 official championships.

Domestic
QVA Cup

 Winners (1): 2007

See also
 Al Sadd SC

Qatari volleyball clubs